Bettina is a feminine given name.

Bettina may also refer to:

Surname 
 Judith Bettina, American soprano and music educator
 Melio Bettina (1916–1996), American boxer

Other uses 
 Bettina (horse), a racehorse
 Bettina (opera), by Friedrich Schenker and Karl Mickel, debuted 1987
 Bettina, Texas, a ghost town
 250 Bettina, an asteroid
 Bettina Tower, in Gudja, Malta
 Ta' Bettina Tower, in Marsaxlokk, Malta
 Cyclone Bettina (1968)